Sommariva Perno is a comune (municipality) in the Province of Cuneo in the Italian region Piedmont, located in Roero about  southeast of Turin and about  northeast of Cuneo.

The municipality of Sommariva Perno contains the frazioni (subdivisions, mainly villages and hamlets) Valle Rossi, San Giuseppe, and Villa.

Sommariva Perno borders the following municipalities: Baldissero d'Alba, Corneliano d'Alba, Monticello d'Alba, Pocapaglia, Sanfrè, and Sommariva del Bosco.

Festivals
The “Sagra della fragola e del vino birbet”, held at the end of May, celebrates two of the typical products of Roero: The local strawberries and Birbèt: a sweet, pomegranate-red, partially fermented, festive wine made from the Roero version of the Brachetto grape, which hangs from the vine in elongated clusters.

Demographic evolution

References

External links
 www.comune.sommarivaperno.cn.it

Cities and towns in Piedmont
Roero